The Gazelle class was a group of ten light cruisers built for the Imperial German Navy at the turn of the 20th century. They were the first modern light cruiser design of the Imperial Navy, and set the basic pattern for all future light cruisers in Imperial service. The design of the Gazelle class attempted to merge the fleet scout with the colonial cruiser.

 was sold to Yugoslavia in 1925 and renamed Dalmacija, and the rest of the cruisers were withdrawn from service by the end of the 1920s and used for secondary duties or broken up for scrap. Medusa and Arcona were converted into anti-aircraft ships in 1940 and were scuttled at the end of World War II. Dalmacija was captured twice during the war, first by the Italians, who renamed her Cattaro, and then by the Germans, who restored the original name of Niobe. She ran aground in December 1943 and was subsequently destroyed by British Motor Torpedo Boats.  was the only member to survive the war intact, as a barracks ship, and she remained in service until 1954, when she was broken up for scrap.

Design 

Through the 1870s and early 1880s, Germany built two types of cruising vessels: small, fast, but lightly armed avisos suitable for service as fleet scouts and larger, long-ranged screw corvettes capable of patrolling the German colonial empire. Beginning in the mid-1880s, General Leo von Caprivi, the Chief of the Imperial Admiralty, embarked on a construction program to modernize Germany's cruiser force. The first step in the program, the two  unprotected cruisers, provided the basis for the larger .

In the early 1890s, naval officers began to consider a new type of cruiser that incorporated the speed of the avisos with the heavier armament and longer cruising radius of the unprotected cruisers. Then-Captain Alfred von Tirpitz, at the time the Chief of Staff of the Imperial Naval High Command (—OKM), wrote a summary of 1894 fleet maneuvers that included what he believed to be the necessary characteristics of a new small cruiser. These included a top speed of at least , armament sufficient to permit them to engage enemy fleet scouts, and an armor deck to protect the ship's propulsion machinery.

The General Department of the Imperial Naval Office (—RMA) issued a call for proposals on 10 May 1895 for the next cruiser, provisionally titled "G". Records of the initial proposals have not survived, though the final design closely followed Tirpitz's specifications outlined in 1894. The design for the first vessel, which would become , was prepared in 1895–1896 by the navy's chief designer, Alfred Dietrich. As additional members of the class were ordered, a series of improvements were incorporated in their designs over the course of 1897–1900.

More problematically, the cost of the new ship would increase by around 26 percent, which the  would not likely approve.

The design was somewhat smaller than contemporary light cruisers, but the ships were nevertheless sturdy and powerfully armed for the period. These characteristics evenly balanced the requirements for the two roles envisioned for the class. According to the historian Eric Osborne, "[t]he light cruisers of the Gazelle-class established a trend for future ships of this general design...[they] carried little or no armor, the chief asset being speed."

General characteristics

They had a draft of  forward and  aft. The ships' hulls were constructed with transverse and longitudinal steel frames; the outer hull wall consisted of wooden planks covered with a layer of Muntz metal to prevent fouling. The Muntz metal extended up to a meter above the waterline. The hull was divided into twelve watertight compartments and it had a double bottom that extended for 40 percent of the length of the keel. For the last three ships, their double bottom was lengthened to 46 percent of the hull.

All ten ships were crank and rolled severely. They were also wet in a head sea. After their modernizations, they tended to suffer from lee helm. Nevertheless, the ships turned tightly and were very maneuverable. In a hard turn, their speed fell up to 65 percent. The Gazelle class required a crew of 14 officers and 243 enlisted men, though for the last three ships, the number of enlisted men rose to 256. They carried a number of boats, including one picket boat, one pinnace, two cutters, two yawls, and one dinghy.

Machinery
Their propulsion system consisted of two triple-expansion engines  manufactured by the dockyards that built the ships. The engines were powered by eight coal-fired water-tube boilers of various manufacture, divided into two boiler rooms. The ships were equipped with three electricity generators that provided a total of 110 kilowatts at 110 volts.

Armament and armor
The ships were armed with ten 10.5 cm SK L/40 guns in single mounts. Two were placed side by side forward on the forecastle, six were located amidships, three on either side, and two were placed side by side aft. They were supplied with 1,000 rounds of ammunition, for 100 shells per gun, though the allotment for the last three ships increased to 1,500 rounds, or 150 per gun. They were also equipped with torpedo tubes. Gazelle had three  tubes with eight torpedoes; one was submerged in the hull in the bow and two were mounted in deck launchers on the broadside. The rest of the class only had two 45 cm tubes with five torpedoes, and these were submerged in the ships' hulls, on the broadside.

The armor consisted of two layers of steel with a single layer of Krupp steel. The Gazelle-class cruisers were also equipped with cork cofferdams to increase buoyancy.

Construction

The ten ships of the Gazelle class were built between 1897 and 1904, at various German dockyards, including private firms and government shipyards.

Service history 

The Gazelle-class cruisers served in various capacities after their commissioning. Most of them served with the fleet reconnaissance force, though several served on foreign stations as well. Gazelle served abroad in 1902–1904, Thetis in 1902–1906, Niobe in 1906–1909, and Arcona in 1907–1910. Nymphe was also used as a training ship for naval cadets in addition to her fleet scout role, and Undine served as a gunnery training ship.

Due to their age, the Gazelles had been placed in reserve by 1914, but after the outbreak of World War I in August 1914, they were mobilized for active service. Most were initially used as coastal defense vessels in the Baltic, but Frauenlob and Ariadne remained in service with the fleet. They both saw action at the Battle of Heligoland Bight on 28 August 1914; Frauenlob engaged and badly damaged the British cruiser , while Ariadne was sunk by several battlecruisers. In the Baltic, Undine was torpedoed and sunk by the British submarine  on 7 November 1915.

The seven surviving ships were withdrawn from front-line service in 1916 and disarmed, with the exception of Medusa, which retained six of her guns, and Thetis, which was rearmed with nine 10.5 cm U-boat guns for use as a gunnery training ship. The remaining seven cruisers survived the war and went on to serve in the new Reichsmarine, except for Gazelle, which was broken up for scrap in 1920. The ships remained in service throughout the 1920s, but were all withdrawn by the early 1930s. Niobe was sold to Yugoslavia in 1925 and renamed Dalmacija, while Nymphe and Thetis were scrapped in the early 1930s. Arcona, Medusa, and Amazone were used as barracks hulks for the rest of the 1930s.

After the outbreak of World War II, Medusa and Arcona were converted into floating anti-aircraft batteries and defended German ports from 1940 to the end of the war, when they were scuttled by their crews on 3 May 1945. Amazone meanwhile remained in service as a barracks ship through the end of the war. Dalmacija was captured by the Italians after the Invasion of Yugoslavia in April 1941, renamed Cattaro, and pressed into service with the Italian Navy. She was then captured by the Germans after the Italian surrender in September 1943, and returned to her original name, Niobe. The ship ran aground in the Adriatic in December 1943 and was destroyed by a pair of British Motor Torpedo Boats. Niobe, Medusa, and Arcona were broken up for scrap in the late 1940s, but Amazone lingered on as a barracks ship until 1954, when she too was sold for scrapping.

Footnotes

References

Further reading
 

 
Cruiser classes